Beaulieu is a commune in the Côte-d'Or department in eastern France.

Geography 
Beaulieu is a small community (less than seven square kilometers) positioned on the plateau of Chatillonais off of the western area of the Langres plateau. The area consists of three kilometers of sloping hills with two rivers that are mostly forested with the southern area part of the great forest of Chatillon.

Population

See also
Communes of the Côte-d'Or department

References

Communes of Côte-d'Or
Lingones
Côte-d'Or communes articles needing translation from French Wikipedia